María Amparo Rivelles Ladrón de Guevara MML (11 February 1925 – 7 November 2013), better known as Amparo Rivelles, was a Spanish actress.

She was the daughter of actor Rafael Rivelles and actress María Fernanda Ladrón de Guevara, and the half-sister of actor Carlos Larrañaga.

She spent 20 years in Mexico, where she worked in Mexican films and telenovelas. 

During her long career, she earned a LatinACE award, a Goya Award, as well as a National Theater Prize.

Selected filmography
El olor de las manzanas (1999)
Sombras y luces. Cien años de cine español (1996)
 El día que nací yo (1991)
 Esquilache (1989)
 Hay que deshacer la casa (1983)
 La coquito (1977)
 ¿Quién mató al abuelo? (1971)
 El juicio de los hijos (1970)
 Una vez un hombre... (1970)
 La cruz de Marisa Cruces (1969)
 Anita de Montemar (1969)
 La casa de las muchachas (1969)
 Los problemas de mamá (1968)
 El dia de las madres (1968)
 Cuando los hijos se van (1968)
 Los novios de mis hijas (1964)
La mujer dorada
 Un ángel tuvo la culpa (1960)
 El Esqueleto de la señora Morales (1960)
 El amor que yo te di (1959)
 The Battalion in the Shadows (1957)
 Mr. Arkadin (1955)
 El indiano (1954)
 The Lioness of Castille (1951)
 Dawn of America (1951)
 Woman to Woman (1950)
 The Duchess of Benameji (1949)
 The Sunless Street (1948)
 Si te hubieses casado conmigo (1948)
 Fuenteovejuna (1947) 
 Anguish (1947)
 The Faith (1947)
 The Nail (1944)
 Eugenia de Montijo (1944)
 Eloisa Is Under an Almond Tree (1943)
 Deliciosamente tontos (1943)
 A Famous Gentleman (1943)
 Malvaloca (1942)
 We Thieves Are Honourable (1942)
 Heart of Gold (1941)

Honours 
 Gold Medal of Merit in Labour (Kingdom of Spain, 13 December 2002).

References

External links

1925 births
2013 deaths
Actresses from Madrid
Spanish film actresses
Best Actress Goya Award winners